The 2010 America East Conference baseball tournament took place from May 26 through 28 at Varsity Field in Vestal, New York. The top four regular season finishers of the league's six teams qualified for the double-elimination tournament. In the championship game, third-seeded Stony Brook defeated fourth-seeded Albany, 4-2, to win its third tournament championship. As a result, Stony Brook received the America East's automatic bid to the 2010 NCAA Tournament.

Seeding 
The top four finishers from the regular season were seeded one through four based on conference winning percentage only. They then played in a double-elimination format. In the first round, the one and four seeds were matched up in one game, while the two and three seeds were matched up in the other.

Results

All-Tournament Team 
The following players were named to the All-Tournament Team.

Most Outstanding Player 
Stony Brook catcher Pat Cantwell was named Most Outstanding Player.

References 

America East Conference Baseball Tournament
Tournament
American East Conference baseball tournament
America East Conference baseball tournament
College baseball tournaments in New York (state)